The Army of the Principality of Catalonia (Catalan: Exèrcit del Principat de Catalunya) was the army raised by the Junta de Braços of Catalonia (assembly of representatives of the Catalan Courts without the king) on 9 July 1713 after the English treason with the Treaty of Utrecht and the withdrawal of Imperial troops by the L'Hospitalet Agreement. The army was made up of 10,000 infantry, 1,600 cavalry and 1,000 naval troops. It is not known how many men formed the artillery unit but it did not exceed 700. In total, the army contained 13,000 regular troops.

On 9 July 1713 the Principality of Catalonia declared war on the Kingdom of France and the Duke of Anjou (Philip V of Spain), who since the Catalan constitutions of 1706 did not recognize him as the legitimate king of the Monarchy of Spain and the next day it published a ban to remove troops for the Army of Catalonia, being his first units the Regiment of the Deputation of the General of Catalonia and the Regiment of the City of Barcelona. For the position of general commander of the Army they appointed Lieutenant Marshal Antoni de Villarroel i Peláez on 10 July. The artillery and the Cavalry Regiment of the Faith were financed by the merchant Amador Dalmau and Colom, as well as two ships for the Navy.

Infantry 

The formation of the Army of Catalonia in total had 10,000 men of regular infantry and was based on two regiments of already existing infantry. From these, up to eight new regiments of regulated infantry were raised, taking advantage of the soldiers and experienced officers who had remained in Catalonia after the withdrawal of the allied armies.

 Regiment de la Diputació del General de Catalunya
 Regiment de la Ciutat de Barcelona
 Regiment de la Immaculada Concepció
 Regiment de Santa Eulàlia 
 Regiment d'Infanteria de la Mare de Déu dels Desemparats
 Regiment de Sant Narcís
 Regiment de Nostra Senyora del Roser
 Regiment del coronel Busquets

The colonels were the urban militias of the main cities of Catalonia during the early modern period: Coronela de Barcelona, Coronela de Lleida, Coronela de Tortosa, Coronela de Tarragona o coronela de Manresa, cities that sheltered them Catalan constitutions enjoyed autonomy to arm themselves and defend themselves in case of aggression. They were formed by militarized citizens of the guilds Offices Even so, the Coroneles and mercenary troops such as miquelets were not included in the army, the troops had to be professional and well-armed.

Cavalry 
The cavalry, in the first moments of the formation of the Army of Catalonia, were of a high strategic importance. Thanks to its high mobility, the Catalan authorities hoped to use it to avoid the collapse of important sites in Bourbon hands and open fronts in the interior of Catalonia. This branch was composed of six regiments, which were formed or reordered, as well as other companies, such as the hússars hongaresos, surely framed in Sant Jordi.

 Regiment de cavalleria Rafael Nebot
 Regiment of cavalry La Fe
 Regiment of cavalry Sant Jordi
 Regiment de cavalleria Dragons-Cuirassers de Sant Miquel
 Regiment of cavalry Sant Jaume
 Regiment of cavalry Pere de Bricfeus
 Company of cavalry of Jordi Badia

Artillery 

The artillery was organized in a regimental unit under the command of Valencian general Joan Baptista Basset, who also commanded the  engineers. Deployed in Barcelona, the gunners had an important artillery park with pieces of bronze of good quality. The artillery companies were primarily made up of Majorcan artillerymen and bombers, of a very high reputation, who were already experienced in fighting against the Ottomans.

 Artillery of Catalonia (5 companies)

Navy 
In addition to other small and medium-sized boats and boats, the Navy of Catalonia had three large vessels: the Mare de Déu de la Mercè and Santa Eulàlia, led by Miquel Vaquer, the Sant Francesc of Paula, with Captain Josep Tauler and Santa Madrona, a captured French frigate placed under the command of Josep Capó. Like reinforcement to the crews of the Navy 200 orphan guys, from the House of Charity of Barcelona, they were gotten up to the ships. 
 (Originally 80 gun-ship, fought at war without refilling it with cannons) line ship San Francesc de Paula
 72 gun ship of the line Nostra Senyora de la Mercè
 72 gun ship of the line Santa Madrona
 40 guns frigate-ship of line Sant Josep
 6 frigates
 9 brigs
 50 tartanas de guerra

References

Bibliography
Albertí i Gubern, S. L'Onze de setembre (Barcelona, 2006) 
Bruguera, M. Historia del memorable sitio y bloqueo de Barcelona y heroica defensa de los fueros y privilegios de Cataluña en 1713 y 1714 (1871)

Military history of Catalonia
Principality of Catalonia
Early Modern Catalonia
War of the Spanish Succession